Handball Federation of Bosnia and Herzegovina (Bosnian, Croatian and Serbian: Rukometni savez Bosne i Hercegovine /Рукометни савез Босне и Херцеговине) is the highest Handball governing body in the country. It organizes the Handball Championship of Bosnia and Herzegovina and Handball Cup of Bosnia and Herzegovina.

It also organizes the matches of the Bosnia and Herzegovina men's national handball team. That includes men and women, and youth teams as well.

History
The Handball Federation was founded in 1948, and was part of the Yugoslav Handball Federation. When Bosnia and Herzegovina gained independence in 1992, it became the national handball governing body, and later a member of European Handball Federation (1995) and International Handball Federation (1996).

Handball is the most popular sport in Bosnia and Herzegovina after football and basketball. There is a big number of clubs all over the country. Many Bosnian clubs were members of a very strong Yugoslav league, and RK Borac Banja Luka won the EHF Champions League in the 1975–76 season. Another team from the country that was famous in European competitions is Sloga from Doboj.

External links
EHF
IHF
RS

Bosnia
Bosnia
Bosnia
Handball in Bosnia and Herzegovina
Sports governing bodies in Bosnia and Herzegovina
Sports organizations established in 1948